XHTNO-FM is a radio station in Tulancingo, Hidalgo.

History
XHTNO received its concession on July 22, 1992. It was owned by Arturo Emilio Zorrilla Ibarra and broadcast with 3 kW on 96.3 MHz. XHTNO changed frequencies in 2007 to its present 102.9 MHz.

References

Radio stations in Hidalgo (state)